Ann Scott (born 1950) is a British feminist author born in London to an American father and British mother.

Education and career
She then taught psychoanalysis at London University and published in Feminist Review and History Workshop Journal.
She worked with Ruth First with whom she co-authored a 1980 book on Olive Schreiner, entitled Olive Schreiner (published by Deutsch).

She worked for Free Association Books until she moved to the USA in 1989.

References

1950 births
Living people
British feminist writers